Faith, Hope & Love is a 2019 American romantic comedy film directed by J.J. Englert and Robert Krantz and starring Peta Murgatroyd, Krantz, Michael Richards, Corbin Bernsen, Natasha Bure and Ed Asner in one of his final film roles during his lifetime.

Cast
Peta Murgatroyd as Faith Turley
Robert Krantz as Jimmy Hope
Michael Richards as Daddy Hogwood
Corbin Bernsen as Brian Fuller
M. Emmet Walsh as Fr. John
Natasha Bure as Gia Elpidas
Nancy Stafford as Mary Sue
Gary Hershberger as Tommy
Aria Walters as Demetra Elpidas
Ed Asner as Harry Karetas
Soomin Chun as Amy Chen
Raymond Forchion as Joe
Dennis Garr as Security Guard
Karen Y. McClain as Coretta Maxwell
Ambrit Millhouse as Jasmine
Joey Nader as Joey

Reception
Tara McNamara of Common Sense Media awarded the film four stars out of five.

References

External links 
 
 
 

American romantic comedy films
2010s English-language films
2010s American films